This is a list of players who have scored eight or more points in a National Hockey League game. Scoring eight or more points in a single game is considered a great feat and has happened only 16 times, by 13 players.  Only one player, Darryl Sittler, scored more than eight points in a game, setting the NHL record with 10 while playing for the Toronto Maple Leafs in 1976. Paul Coffey and Tom Bladon are the only defensemen to have scored eight points. The feat of scoring eight points in a game was mostly achieved in the 1980s, with 10 out of the 16 instances happening in that decade. Mario Lemieux has the most games with at least eight points, scoring eight points in three separate games (in one season). Wayne Gretzky is the only other player to attain the feat more than once (twice, in one season). The most recent player to do so was Sam Gagner of the Edmonton Oilers, who scored eight points against the Chicago Blackhawks on 2 February 2012; Gagner's 8-point night was also the first 8-point game for a player since the 1980s.

Scorers
Legend

References
General
 
 
 

8 point games
National Hockey League statistical records